The Canadian Army Doctrine and Training Centre (CADTC) (French: , formerly the Land Force Doctrine and Training System (LFDTS), is a formation of the Canadian Army headquartered at McNaughton Barracks, CFB Kingston, Ontario. CADTC is the organization that is responsible for delivering army training and developing army doctrine. Approximately 3,200 officers and soldiers are assigned to CADTC. The organization was renamed on 18 July 2013 as part of the reorganization of the Canadian Army.

Structure
The Canadian Army Doctrine and Training Centre is composed of its headquarters in Kingston and a number of training establishments across Canada.

 Canadian Army Doctrine and Training Centre Headquarters, at CFB Kingston
 Canadian Army Command and Staff College, at CFB Kingston
 Canadian Manoeuvre Training Centre, at CFB Wainwright
 Army Doctrine Centre, at CFB Kingston
 Canadian Army Simulation Centre, at CFB Kingston
 Canadian Army Lessons Learned Centre, at CFB Kingston
 Peace Support Training Centre, at CFB Kingston
 Canadian Armed Forces Arctic Training Centre, in Resolute (Nunavut))

See also 

 History of the Canadian Army
 Canadian Forces

References

External links

Canadian Army Command and Staff College
Combat Training Centre Gagetown
 Canadian Army Lessons Learned Centre Dispatches
 Canadian Army Lessons Learned Centre Bulletin

Military units and formations of the Canadian Army
Military units and formations established in 2000
Canadian Armed Forces education and training establishments
Military education and training in Canada
Canadian Armed Forces